Oostelijke Eilanden (lit. Eastern Islands), also known as Oostelijke Eilanden en Kadijken (Eastern Islands and Quays), is a neighbourhood in the centre of Amsterdam, Netherlands, consisting of Kattenburg, Wittenburg and Oostenburg.

Geography
The islands are bounded to the south by the Nieuwe Vaart and to the north by the Dijksgracht. They are separated by the Kattenburgervaart between Kattenburg and Wittenburg, as well as by the Wittenburgervaart between Wittenburg and Oostenburg. Oostenburg contains what remains of the Oostenburgervaart. Notable buildings include  the Oosterkerk and 's Lands Zeemagazijn (Het Scheepvaartmuseum), as well as the INIT Building, which houses de Volkskrant, Trouw and Het Parool.

See also
 Czaar Peterbuurt

Sources
 Een Roerig Volkje. De geschiedenis van de Oostelijke Eilanden, Kadijken en Czaar Peterbuurt. Door Ton Heijdra, Uitgeverij René de Milliano, Alkmaar 1999. .
 De Plantage, Kadijken, en Oostelijke Eilanden. Een buurt in beeld. Amsterdam publishers, 1999.
 Tot ziens op Kattenburg! De wederopbouw van de oostelijke eilanden 1960-1980. Door Ine Vermaas. Uitgave Wijkcentrum Oostelijke Binnenstad. Amsterdam, 2006.

Neighbourhoods of Amsterdam